Imbophorus aptalis is a species of moth of the family Pterophoridae. It is found in Australia (from northern Queensland to southern New South Wales and south-western Australia), as well as the New Hebrides, Fiji and Tonga.

The wingspan is about 17–25 mm.

The larvae feed on Astrotricha latifolia and Astrotricha floccosa.

References

Pterophorini
Moths of Australia
Moths described in 1864
Taxa named by Francis Walker (entomologist)